Lechenaultia tubiflora, commonly known as heath leschenaultia, is a species of flowering plant in the family Goodeniaceae and is endemic to the south-west of Western Australia. It is a hemispherical subshrub or more or less erect perennial with crowded, narrow, rigid leaves and variably-coloured, tube-shaped flowers.

Description
The tube is hairy inside and there are often orange red or blue marks on the petal wings and lobes.

Taxonomy
Lechenaultia subcymosa was first formally described in 1810 by Robert Brown in Prodromus Florae Novae Hollandiae et Insulae Van Diemen. The specific epithet (tubiflora) means "tube-flowered".

Distribution and habitat
Heath leschenaultia grows on sand in heath or woodland between Coorow and Albany, and in near-coastal areas between Albany and Israelite Bay in the Avon Wheatbelt, Esperance Plains, Geraldton Sandplains, Jarrah Forest, Mallee, Swan Coastal Plain, and Warren biogeographic regions of south-western Western Australia.

Conservation status
This leschenaultia is listed as "not threatened" by the Government of Western Australia Department of Biodiversity, Conservation and Attractions.

References

External links 
 Lechenaultia tubiflora: occurrence data from the Australasian Virtual Herbarium

Taxa named by Robert Brown (botanist, born 1773)
Plants described in 1810
Flora of Australia
Eudicots of Western Australia